Samuel Nguiffo is a Cameroonian lawyer. He is manager of the Center for Environment and Development in Yaoundé. He was awarded  the Goldman Environmental Prize in 1999, for his efforts on protection of the  tropical rainforests of Central Africa.

References 

Year of birth missing (living people)
Living people
People from Yaoundé
Cameroonian lawyers
Cameroonian environmentalists
Goldman Environmental Prize awardees